The Antarctic Plate is a tectonic plate containing the continent of Antarctica, the Kerguelen Plateau, and some remote islands in the Southern Ocean and other surrounding oceans. After breakup from Gondwana (the southern part of the supercontinent Pangea), the Antarctic plate began moving the continent of Antarctica south to its present isolated location, causing the continent to develop a much colder climate. The Antarctic Plate is bounded almost entirely by extensional mid-ocean ridge systems. The adjoining plates are the Nazca Plate, the South American Plate, the African Plate, the Somali Plate, the Indo-Australian Plate, the Pacific Plate, and, across a transform boundary, the Scotia Plate.

It is Earth's fifth-largest tectonic plate.

Subduction beneath South America
The Antarctic Plate started to subduct beneath South America 14 million years ago in the Miocene epoch. At first it subducted only in the southernmost tip of Patagonia, meaning that the Chile Triple Junction lay near the Strait of Magellan. As the southern part of the Nazca Plate and the Chile Rise became consumed by subduction the more northerly regions of the Antarctic Plate began to subduct beneath Patagonia so that the Chile Triple Junction lies at present in front of Taitao Peninsula at 46°15' S. 
The subduction of the Antarctic Plate beneath South America is held to have uplifted Patagonia as it reduced the previously vigorous down-dragging flow in the Earth's mantle caused by the subduction of the Nazca Plate beneath Patagonia. The dynamic topography caused by this uplift raised Quaternary-aged marine terraces and beaches across the Atlantic coast of Patagonia.

Land 
 Amsterdam Island (France)
 Antarctica (Antarctic Treaty System)
 East Antarctica
 Transantarctic Mountains
 West Antarctica
 Antarctic Peninsula
 Crozet Islands (France)
 Heard Island and McDonald Islands (Australia)
 Heard Island
 McDonald Islands
 Kerguelen Islands (France)
 Peter I Island (Antarctic Treaty System)
 Prince Edward Islands (South Africa)
 Saint Paul Island (France)
 South Orkney Islands (Antarctic Treaty System)
 South Shetland Islands (Antarctic Treaty System)
Shetland Plate

References 

Tectonic plates
Geology of Antarctica
Geology of Chile
Geology of the Pacific Ocean
Geology of the Indian Ocean
Geology of the Southern Ocean